Toruń is a city in Poland.

Torun or Toruń may also refer to:

Places
Poland
Toruń, Lublin Voivodeship, a village in eastern Poland
Stary Toruń, a village near the city
Toruń County, an administrative unit in Poland based on the city
Toruń Voivodeship, a former administrative unit in Poland based on the city
Toruń (parliamentary constituency), a Polish parliamentary constituency based on the city
United States
Torun, Wisconsin, an unincorporated community

People
Władysław Toruń (1889–1924), Polish military pilot and aviation pioneer
Sviatlana Sudak Torun (born 1971), Belarusian-born Turkish hammer thrower
Tunay Torun (born 1990), German-born Turkish footballer
Vivianna Torun Bülow-Hübe (1927–2004), Swedish silversmith and master jeweller

Name
An Old Norse female given name meaning "Beloved of Thor"

Other
12999 Toruń - main-belt asteroid

Turkish-language surnames

is:Þórunn
no:Torunn
nn:Torunn
sv:Torun